Richwood is an unincorporated community in Dooly County, in the U.S. state of Georgia.

History
Richwood had its start as a lumber town, and most likely was named for the thick woods which once covered the site. A post office called Richwood was established in 1887, and remained in operation until 1947.

References

Unincorporated communities in Dooly County, Georgia
Unincorporated communities in Georgia (U.S. state)